The list of ship launches in 1756 includes a chronological list of some ships launched in 1756.


References

1756
Ship launches